Thecla betulina is a butterfly of the family Lycaenidae. It was described by Otto Staudinger in 1887. It is found in the Russian Far East (Ussuri, Amur), north-eastern China and Korea. The species is found in the forest belt where it inhabits forest edges and river valleys.

Adults often visit flowering Umbelliferae species.

The larvae feed on Malus species (including M. mandschurica) and possibly Pyrus species. They roll a leaf of their host plant, forming a tube. Full-grown larvae are green. Pupation takes place in the soil near the host plant.

Subspecies
Thecla betulina betulina
Thecla betulina minekoae Morita, 2003 (China: Yunnan)
Thecla betulina shibasakii Morita, 2003 (China: Heilongjiang)

References

 "Thecla betulina Staudinger, 1887" at Insecta.pro

Butterflies described in 1887
Thecla (butterfly)
Butterflies of Asia
Taxa named by Otto Staudinger